The People's Political Party (PPP) was Jamaica's first modern political party.

Formed in September 1929 by Marcus Garvey, the PPP set out a 14 point manifesto—the first of its kind in the island's electoral history. The points contained in the PPP's manifesto were far-reaching and perceptive as illustrated by a few of them, such as:
 An eight-hour work day
 A minimum wage
 A larger share of self-government
 Protection for native industries
 A legal aid department for the poor
 Technical schools for each parish
 Land reform
 Libraries and civic improvement for parish capitals 
 City status for Montego Bay and Port Antonio
 A National Park at the Kingston Race Course

The PPP contested the 1962 elections, receiving 0.9% of the vote and failing to win a seat. The party did not contest any further elections.

References 

History of the Colony of Jamaica
Defunct political parties in Jamaica
Political parties established in 1929